John Patrick Brown ( 1919–1922) was a New Zealand rugby league footballer.

A second-row forward, Brown played for the Kohinoor club (now known as Cobden-Kohinoor) in Greymouth. He was the first player from the West Coast to represent New Zealand.

He toured Australia in 1919 with the national side, a tour where no test matches were played.

References 

New Zealand rugby league players
West Coast rugby league team players
New Zealand national rugby league team players
Auckland rugby league team players
Rugby league second-rows
Cobden-Kohinoor players
20th-century New Zealand people
Year of birth missing
Year of death missing